János Mogyorósi-Klencs (31 March 1922 – 22 July 1997) was a Hungarian gymnast, born in Debrecen. He competed in gymnastics events at the 1948 Summer Olympics and the 1952 Summer Olympics. He won a bronze medal with the Hungarian team at the 1948 Summer Olympics, as well as an individual silver medal in floor exercise, and a bronze medal in horse vault.

References

External links
 

1922 births
1997 deaths
People from Debrecen
Hungarian male artistic gymnasts
Gymnasts at the 1948 Summer Olympics
Gymnasts at the 1952 Summer Olympics
Olympic gymnasts of Hungary
Olympic silver medalists for Hungary
Olympic bronze medalists for Hungary
Olympic medalists in gymnastics
Medalists at the 1948 Summer Olympics
20th-century Hungarian people